Lasiogaster is a species of beetle in the family Cerambycidae. It is monotypic, being represented by the single species Lasiogaster costipennis.

References

Prioninae